Armand Schwerner (1927 – February 4, 1999) was an avant-garde Jewish-American poet. His most famous work, Tablets, is a series of poems which claim to be reconstructions of ancient Sumero-Akkadian inscriptions, complete with lacunae and "untranslatable" words.

Schwerner was born in Antwerp, Belgium, and his family moved to the United States when he was nine years old. He attended Columbia University (B.A. 1950, M.A. 1964) and taught at universities in the New York City area until his retirement in 1998.

References

External links
 
 
 
 
 
 

Jewish poets
20th-century American poets
People from Staten Island
1927 births
1999 deaths